Djelloul Baghli, born in 1929, november, 12th in Tlemcen (Algeria), died in 2020, december,  was the Algerian minister for professional training in the 1992 government of Belaid Abdessalam..

References 

Living people
Year of birth missing (living people)
Algerian politicians
21st-century Algerian people